Lynden Evans (June 28, 1858 – May 6, 1926) was a U.S. Representative from Illinois.

Born in LaSalle, Illinois, his siblings included Frederic Dahl Evans. Evans attended the public schools and was graduated from Knox College, Galesburg, Illinois, in 1882.
He taught in the schools of La Salle and Evanston, Illinois.
He studied law.
He was admitted to the bar in 1885 and commenced practice at Chicago, Illinois.
Lecturer on corporation law in the John Marshall Law School in 1907 and 1908.

Evans was elected as a Democrat to the Sixty-second Congress (March 4, 1911 – March 3, 1913).
He was an unsuccessful candidate for reelection in 1912 to the Sixty-third Congress.

He resumed the practice of law in Chicago, Illinois, until his death there on May 6, 1926.
He was interred in Graceland Cemetery.

References

1858 births
1926 deaths
Lawyers from Chicago
People from LaSalle, Illinois
Knox College (Illinois) alumni
American people of Welsh descent
Burials at Graceland Cemetery (Chicago)
Democratic Party members of the United States House of Representatives from Illinois
19th-century American lawyers